In baseball statistics, a putout (denoted by PO or fly out when appropriate) is given to a defensive player who records an out by a Tagging a runner with the ball when he is not touching a base (a tagout), catching a batted or thrown ball and tagging a base to put out a batter or runner (a Force out), catching a thrown ball and tagging a base to record an out on an appeal play, catching a third strike (a strikeout), catching a batted ball on the fly (a flyout), or being positioned closest to a runner called out for interference.

Jake Beckley is the all-time leader in career putouts with 23,743. Cap Anson (22,572), Ed Konetchy (21,378), Eddie Murray (21,265), Charlie Grimm (20,722), and Stuffy McInnis (20,120) are the only other players to record 20,000 career putouts.

Key

List

Stats updated as of the end of the 2022 season.

Notes

References

External links

Major League Baseball statistics
Putouts